eNlight Cloud is a cloud computing platform based on the Xen virtualization platform by Nashik, Maharashtra-based ESDS Software Solution Pvt. Ltd. It allows a hosted virtual machine (VM) to scale resources such as CPU and RAM automatically in real time. It bills on a prepaid, pay-per-consume basis.

History
According to ESDS, eNlight Cloud scales computing resources such as RAM and CPU automatically without requiring a reboot or causing downtime. eNlight Cloud allows a user to rent virtual machines that can be created, modified and terminated using the management panel, as required. eNlight Cloud was launched on 21 November 2011 by former captain of the Indian cricket team and Chairman of the Selection Committee, Kris Srikkanth.

eNlight Cloud provides public, private and hybrid models of cloud deployment. It was launched in the UK on 12 January 2012 as a service offering with eUKhost Ltd.

Features and characteristics

Management panel

eNlight Cloud comes with a web-based management panel, a type of control panel developed using the PHP & Python scripting language, used to create VMs, edit VM settings, start, shutdown and reboot VMs, forecast VM bills and perform critical operations. The eNlight management panel is a browser-based panel and can be accessed on the Internet. The panel can be used to monitor the performance of VMs, view stats of VMs as well as take snapshots, monitor the RAM and CPU usage along with the amount spent on an hourly, daily and monthly basis.

It supports public API, Operation Job Scheduling and Role-based user access. Users can also build custom application templates and deploy on eNlight Cloud for scalability.

Scaling
eNlight Cloud has an auto scaling feature that caters to sudden or erratic resource requirements and unpredictable system demands. eNlight's virtual platform scales resources dynamically depending on the usage pattern. It does this without manual intervention or system reboots. eNlight Cloud does support horizontal scaling options too. It can vertically scale up to 512GB RAM and 128 vCPUs.

The scaling method is patented in the US and UK patent office with patent number , .

Payment model
eNlight Cloud works on a pay per consume billing model and charges users on the resources that are used out of the total resources that may be allocated to a particular VM. eNlight is the first cloud platform where the billing system is based on the real time resource usage, as opposed to the resources allocated to the virtual machine. During the period when a VM is inactive, eNlight Cloud users are not charged for the resources that may be used. Instead, users are charged only for the storage that is being allocated to the virtual server during non-operational hours.

Guest operating systems
eNlight Cloud supports Windows Server as well as Linux distributions such as CentOS. However, vertical auto scaling is only supported on certain operating systems such as Windows Server 2008, 2012, 2016 (Standard and Datacenter Editions) and Linux distributions including CentOS, Red Hat Enterprise Linux, SUSE Linux, Ubuntu, Fedora, Debian and Oracle Linux. Other operating systems are supported without scaling options, such as Windows Server 2003 and Windows 7.

Limitations
There are some limitations to eNlight Cloud:
 Does not support CPU scaling on Windows; only RAM scaling.
 VMs can only scale to the limits of the underlying hardware.

See also
 Comparison of file hosting services

References

External links 
 Official Website

Cloud platforms
Cloud infrastructure